Manfred Glienke (born 19 August 1954) is a German chess International Master (IM, 1999) who won West Germany Chess Championship (1982).

Biography 
Manfred Glienke was one of the leading chess players in Germany in the early 1980s. He was participant of several West German and German Chess Championships. In 1982 in Bad Neuenahr-Ahrweiler Manfred Glienke won West Germany Chess Championship. In 1996 in Eger he won international chess tournament. In 1998 he won Berlin City Chess Championship.

With West German Chess Team Manfred Glienke participated in European Team Chess Championship in 1983. For many years Manfred Glienke competed in the German Chess Bundesliga. He played for the chess club Kreuzberg e.V..

References

External links 

1954 births
Living people
People from Schwalm-Eder-Kreis
Chess International Masters
German chess players